Dorylaimia is a subclass of nematodes.

Description 
In general, members of subclass Dorylaimia exhibit a great diversity of terrestrial and freshwater species, most of which are large predators or omnivorous free-living species. Some are plant parasites, whereas others are animal parasites (Trichinellida and Mermithida). No members of the Dorylaimia are found in marine habitats. Dorylaimia bear an odontostyle, a protrusible, hollow, needlelike tooth for puncturing and emptying food items.

Taxonomy 
Phylogenetic analysis of phylum Nematoda suggests three distinct basal clades, the dorylaims, enoplids, and chromadorids. These represent Clades I, II and C+S of Blaxter (1998). Of these, the first two appear to have sister clade status, allowing resolution into two classes, Enoplea and Chromadorea, and division of the former into two subclasses corresponding to Clades I and II respectively, the Enoplia and Dorylaimia. Nevertheless, the possibility remains that Dorylaimia will eventually be shown to be a distinct third class of nematodes.

Subdivision 
Phylogenetic analysis has resulted in a reorganization, with, for instance, moving the Triplonchida to subclass Enoplia.

Subclass Dorylaimia is divided into the following orders;
Order Dioctophymatida Baylis and Daubney, 1926
Order Dorylaimida Pearse, 1942
Order Isolaimida Cobb, 1920
Order Marimermithida Rubtzov, 1980
Order Mermithida Hyman, 1951
Order Mononchida Jairajpuri, 1969
Order Muspiceida Bain and Chabaud, 1959
Order Trichinellida Hall, 1916

References

Further reading 

 George O. Poinar Jr. The Evolutionary History of Nematodes: As Revealed in Stone, Amber and Mummies. 2011
 Domingo Jiménez Guirado, Manuel Peralta Peralta, R. Peña Santiago. Nematoda: Mononchida, Dorylaimida I, Volume 30. 2007

Enoplea
Protostome subclasses